Quantum excitation is the effect in circular accelerators or storage rings whereby the discreteness of photon emission causes the charged particles (typically electrons) to undergo a random walk or diffusion process.

Mechanism
An electron moving through a magnetic field emits radiation.  The expected amount of radiation can be calculated using the classical power.  Considering quantum mechanics, however, this radiation is emitted in discrete packets of photons.  For this description, the distribution of number of emitted photons and also the energy spectrum for the electron should be determined instead.

In particular, the spectrum of a bending magnet is given by
 
The diffusion coefficient is given by
 
The result is

Further reading
For an early analysis of the effect of quantum excitation on electron beam dynamics in storage rings, see the article by Matt Sands.

References 

Accelerator physics